Mario Stroeykens (born 29 September 2004) is a Belgian footballer who currently plays as an attacking midfielder for Anderlecht in the Belgian First Division A.

International career
Born in Belgium, to Belgian father and Congolese mother. He is a youth international for Belgium.

Career statistics

References

External links

2004 births
Living people
Belgian footballers
Belgium youth international footballers
Belgian sportspeople of Democratic Republic of the Congo descent
R.S.C. Anderlecht players
Belgian Pro League players
Association football midfielders